Uthrapathisvarar Temple, Keelakadambur, is a Siva temple in Keelakadambur in Cuddalore District in Tamil Nadu (India). It is also known as Kadampai Ilangkoil.

Vaippu Sthalam
It is one of the shrines of the Vaippu Sthalams sung by Tamil Saivite Nayanar Appar.

Presiding deity
The presiding deity is known as Uthrapathisvarar. His consort is known as Soundaranayagi.

Shrines
The temple is in a dilapidated condition. Two lingas and a nandhi are found outside the shrine.

References

External links
 மூவர் தேவார வைப்புத்தலங்கள், kadampai iLangkOil, Sl.No.66 of 139 temples
 Shiva Temples, தேவார வைப்புத்தலங்கள், கடம்பை இளங்கோவில், Sl.No.33 of 133 temples, page1

Hindu temples in Cuddalore district